Sarki Auwalu (born 1965) is a Nigerian chemical engineer. He is the current director general of the Department of Petroleum Resources (DPR) who was appointed by the president of the Federal Republic of Nigeria.

Early life and education

Sarki was born on 1965 in Kano Nigeria. He obtained a bachelor's In Chemical Engineering from Ahmadu Bello university, Zaria. Masters in postgraduate diploma in management (1993) Bayero University Kano.

Career
He worked as environmental engineer at Kano States environmental and protection agency in 1992-1998.

References 

Nigerian chemical engineers

1965 births
Living people